Daniel Berg may refer to:

 Daniel Berg (educator) (born 1929), American scientist, educator and president of Rensselaer Polytechnic Institute
 Daniel Berg (baseball) (born 1984), Australian baseball player
 Daniel Berg (evangelist) (1884–1963), Swedish Pentecostal evangelist missionary
 Daniel Domscheit-Berg (born 1978), German technology activist
 Daniel Berg (basketball) (born 1986), Norwegian basketball player
 Daniel Berg (politician) (born 1988), Hungarian-American politician